Q School may refer to:

 Qualifying school, a qualifying tournament held by many professional golf tours
 Q School (snooker), an amateur qualifying competition for the World Snooker Tour